Lehua East railway station is a railway station of Changjiu Intercity Railway located in Jiangxi, People's Republic of China.

Railway stations in Jiangxi